The Army Training Command, abbreviated as ARTRAC, is one of the seven commands of the Indian Army. It is currently based at Shimla. It was established in 1991.

Lieutenant General SS Mahal is the current commander.

History
The Army Training Command was established on 1 October 1991 at Mhow in Madhya Pradesh and moved to Shimla on 31 March 1993. The main aim of the command is to maximize effectiveness of the training.

In 2019, it was decided to merge the Directorate General of Military Training (DGMT) with ARTRAC. DGMT runs the Rashtriya Military Schools (RMS).

Objectives
Its roles are to:
 Formulate concepts and doctrines of warfare in the fields of strategy, operational art, tactics, logistics, training and human resource development stimulating a real-time scenario.
 Acts as the nodal agency for all institutional training in the Army
 Evolve joint doctrines in conjunction with other Services

List of Commanders

References

External links
 ARTRAC Army Commanders’ Conclave

Commands of the Indian Army
Army training units and formations